Kim Sung-hyun (born 25 June 1993) is a South Korean footballer who plays as defender for Seoul E-Land FC in K-League.

Career
He was selected by Gyeongnam FC in 2012 K-League Draft. He made his K-League debut match against Jeju on 3 November 2012.

References

External links 

1993 births
Living people
Association football defenders
South Korean footballers
Gyeongnam FC players
Chungju Hummel FC players
Ansan Mugunghwa FC players
K League 1 players
K League 2 players
Seoul E-Land FC players